Montique Sharpe (born March 10, 1980) is a former American professional football player who was a defensive tackle in the National Football League (NFL), and the NFL Europe League (NFLE). He played for the Kansas City Chiefs of the NFL, and the Berlin Thunder of NFLE. Sharpe played collegiately at Wake Forest University.

References

1980 births
Living people
American football defensive tackles
Berlin Thunder players
Kansas City Chiefs players
Players of American football from Washington, D.C.
Wake Forest Demon Deacons football players
Dunbar High School (Washington, D.C.) alumni